Jan Erixon (born July 8, 1962) is a Swedish former professional ice hockey player. Erixon was the thirtieth overall pick in the second round by the New York Rangers in the 1981 NHL Entry Draft. He began his NHL career with the Rangers in the 1983–84 season, and played with them through the 1992–93 season.  During his time with the Rangers, his only NHL team, he earned the nickname "The Shadow" because of his work as a defensive forward, often called on to neutralize opposing teams' best players.

His son Tim is also a professional ice hockey player and played in the NHL between 2011 and 2015.

Achievements and awards

 In the 2009 book 100 Ranger Greats, was ranked No. 81 all-time of the 901 New York Rangers who had played during the team's first 82 seasons
Two time winner of the Steven McDonald Extra Effort Award for his services "above and beyond the call of duty".

Career statistics

Regular season and playoffs

International

See also
List of NHL players who spent their entire career with one franchise

References

External links

1962 births
Living people
New York Rangers draft picks
New York Rangers players
People from Skellefteå Municipality
Skellefteå AIK players
Swedish ice hockey left wingers
Swedish expatriate ice hockey players in the United States
Sportspeople from Västerbotten County